John MacSeonin Burke or John de Burgo, O.S.A. (Irish: Seán MacSeóinín de Búrca; died 1450) was an Irish Roman Catholic cleric who was Archbishop of Tuam (1441–1450).

Career 
Burke was appointed Archbishop of Tuam in 1441.

Burke was a member of the Mac Seonin branch of the Bourkes of County Mayo, later anglicised as Jennings. Another notable member of this family was General Charles Edward Jennings de Kilmaine (1751–99).

The History of the Popes comments:

Some of the annalists call him "the Archbishop of Conaught, the son of the Parson, son of Mac Johnin Burke." He died in Galway in the year 1450.

See also
Catholic Church in Ireland

References

External links
 http://www.ucc.ie/celt/published/T100005B/
 http://www.ucc.ie/celt/published/T100005C/
 https://archive.org/stream/fastiecclesiaehi04cottuoft#page/n17/mode/2up

1450 deaths
House of Burgh
Archbishops of Tuam
People from County Galway
15th-century Roman Catholic archbishops in Ireland